New York's 40th State Assembly district is one of the 150 districts in the New York State Assembly. It has been represented by Ron Kim since 2013.

Geography
District 40 is in Queens. It contains portions of Whitestone, Flushing, College Point, and Murray Hill.

Recent election results

2022

2020

2018

2016

2014

2012

References

40